La mia moto is the second studio album by Italian singer-songwriter Jovanotti, released by FRI Records in 1989.

The album reached number four on the FIMI Chart.

Track listing

Charts and certifications

Charts

Year-end charts

Certifications

References

1989 albums
Jovanotti albums
Italian-language albums